The National Trust for Scotland for Places of Historic Interest or Natural Beauty, commonly known as the National Trust for Scotland, is a Scottish conservation organisation. It is the largest membership organisation in Scotland and describes itself as "the conservation charity that protects and promotes Scotland's natural and cultural heritage for present and future generations to enjoy".

It is similar in function to the National Trust, which covers England, Wales, and Northern Ireland, and to other national trusts worldwide.

History
The Trust was established in 1931 following discussions held in the smoking room of Pollok House (now a Trust property). The Trust was incorporated on 1 May 1931, with John Stewart-Murray, 8th Duke of Atholl being elected as its first president, Sir Iain Colqhoun serving as the first chairman. Sir John Stirling Maxwell, owner of Pollok House, was appointed as a vice-president, and provided the trust with its first property, Crookston Castle.  Another early acquisition was Glen Coe, which was purchased with assistance from the Scottish Mountaineering Club in 1935.

In 1935, following the passage of the National Trust for Scotland Order Confirmation Act, the Trust gained the power to declare its properties "inalienable", meaning that they are effectively held in perpituity, and can only be removed from the Trust with parliamentary permission. 

When the Trust took on the management of mountain estates there was controversy concerning issues such as the siting of visitor centres, which some considered inappropriate for land of "wild" character. The Trust has since removed some intrusive facilities, with the original Glen Coe Visitor Centre being removed in 2002; a new centre was built lower down the glen. Similarly the visitor centre at Ben Lawers was removed in 2012.

In August 2010, a report called Fit For Purpose by George Reid, commissioned by the Trust, cited shortcomings that were corrected though organizational restructuring largely completed by the end of its 2011/12 Fiscal Year. The stabilisation of the Trust's finances allowed it to make its first acquisition in seven years when it bought the Alloa Tower in Clackmannanshire in 2015.

Organisation
The Trust is a registered charity under Scottish law.  it employed 469 people on a full-time equivalent basis (or 760 in total when taking account of seasonal employees), and had over 310,000 members. The Trust's Patron is King Charles III; the President is Jackie Bird; the CEO is Philip Long OBE; and the chairman is Sir Mark Jones.

Funding
For the year ended 28 February 2022, the Trust's total income was £51.9 million, up from £44.3 million in 2020–21. The largest sources of income were membership subscriptions (£14.7 million), commercial activities (£9.0 million), investment income (£5.3 million), and property income (£5.3 million). In the same year the Trust's total expenditure was £51.9 million, up from £44.1 million in 2020–21. The Trust therefore recorded an operating  operational deficit of £11.3 million, however this was less bad than anticipated and largely attributed to the aftermath of the COVID-19 pandemic. A three-year Business Recovery Plan is in place to restore financial sustainability and ensure the trust is able to undertake repairs and maintenance delayed by the pandemic, and to continue to invest in conservation and visitor engagement activities at its properties.

Membership
Annual membership of the Trust allows free entry to properties and "Discovery Tickets" are available for shorter term visitors. Membership also provides free entry to National Trust properties in England and Wales and Northern Ireland, and vice versa. The Trust has independent sister organisations in the United States (The National Trust for Scotland Foundation USA), and Canada (The Canadian National Trust for Scotland Foundation). The organisation's membership magazine was Heritage Scotland until 2002 when it was re-named Scotland in Trust.

For the maintenance of its nature properties, the Trust depends on the contributions of volunteers, with local circles of Conservation Volunteers working on projects during weekends. The charity also organises working holidays called "Thistle Camps" on various properties, with activities undertaken including footpath maintenance and woodland work such as rhododendron control.

National Trust for Scotland properties

Historic houses
The Trust owns many historic houses, ranging from large houses such as Culzean Castle and the House of Dun to humbler dwellings such as the Tenement House and Moirlanich Longhouse.

Gardens
The Trust is Scotland's largest garden owner with just under 70 gardens that cover 238 hectares and contain 13,500 varieties of plant. These gardens include 35 "major gardens" with the remainder forming part of other properties. The gardens represent the full history of Scottish gardening ranging from the late medieval at Culross Palace, through the 18th-century picturesque at Culzean Castle and Victorian formality at the House of Dun to 20th-century plant collections at Brodick and Inverewe.

Coastline and countryside

The Trust is the third largest land manager in Scotland, owning 76,000 hectares of Scottish countryside including 46 Munros, more than 400 islands and islets and significant stretches of coastline. Trust countryside properties include Glen Coe, Torridon and Mar Lodge Estate.
The Trust's management of its coastal and countryside sites is guided by its Wild Land Policy which aims to preserve the land in its undeveloped state and provide access and enjoyment to the public. Trust sites are home to a diverse variety of native wildlife. The Trust estimate that almost 25% of Scotland's seabirds nest on its island and coastal sites, equivalent to 8% of seabirds in Europe. The Trust's countryside properties are home to native mammal species including red deer, pine marten, wildcat and red squirrel.

Since 1957, the Trust have owned and managed the archipelago of St Kilda, Scotland's first World Heritage Site and the only World Heritage Site in the UK to be listed for both its natural and cultural significance. St Kilda and the surrounding sea stacks are home to over one million seabirds as well as three species unique to the islands; the Soay sheep; St Kilda field mouse and St Kilda wren.

Paintings and sculpture collection
Across its properties the Trust is responsible for the conservation and display of hundreds of thousands of objects from paintings to furniture and domestic tools. The primary aim of the Trust's curatorship is to present collections and works of art in the historic settings for which they were commissioned or acquired.

Most visited sites
In the year 2021–21 the Trust welcomed 2.2 million visitors to its properties, of which 1.3 million were visits to "gated" properties (properties which non-members are required to pay for entry). In 2016 the 10 most visited properties were:

Gallery

See also
List of National Trust for Scotland properties
Historic Scotland (Dissolved in 2015)
Historic Environment Scotland

References

Bibliography
Bremner, Douglas. For the Benefit of the Nation. McGraw-Hill Contemporary. 2001. 
Greenoak, Francesca. The Gardens of the National Trust for Scotland. Aurum Press Ltd. 2005.

External links

 
Scotland
Conservation in Scotland
Environmental organisations based in Scotland
Heritage organisations in Scotland
Charities based in Edinburgh
British landowners
Scottish culture
British companies established in 1931
Organizations established in 1931
1931 establishments in Scotland
Tourist attractions in Scotland